Biryulya (Bilülü) is a rural locality (a selo) and the administrative centre of Biryulinskoye Rural Settlement of Mayminsky District, the Altai Republic, Russia. The population was 727 as of 2016. There are 18 streets.

Geography 
Biryulya is located in the valley of the Mayma River, 33 km southeast of Mayma (the district's administrative centre) by road. Alexandrovka is the nearest rural locality.

References 

Rural localities in Mayminsky District